Ardes is a commune in the Puy-de-Dôme department in Auvergne-Rhône-Alpes in central France. It is in the canton of Brassac-les-Mines.

Population

Heritage

The Doigt de Mercœur, the remains of a hilltop castle near Ardes.
The 14th century church of Saint-Dizaint

See also
 Communes of the Puy-de-Dôme department

References

Communes of Puy-de-Dôme